Beryozki is a rural locality (a khutor) in Alexeyevsky District, Belgorod Oblast, Russia. The population was 174 as of 2010. There are 3 streets.

Geography 
Beryozki is located 33 km east of Alexeyevka (the district's administrative centre) by road. Ivashchenkovo is the nearest rural locality.

References 

Rural localities in Alexeyevsky District, Belgorod Oblast
Biryuchensky Uyezd